Lorenzo Veglia (born 7 October 1996) is an Italian racing driver currently competing in the Italian GT Championship. He made his debut in 2015.

Racing career
Veglia began his career in 2013 in the European Touring Car Cup, he raced in the Super 1600 division. Finishing 4th in the standings that year. During his time in the European Touring Car Cup he raced under the pseudonym Romeo Luciano. He switched to the SEAT León Eurocup for 2014, he finished the season 12th in the standings. In March 2015, it was announced that Veglia would make his TCR International Series debut with Liqui Moly Team Engstler driving a SEAT León Cup Racer.

Racing record

Complete TCR International Series results
(key) (Races in bold indicate pole position) (Races in italics indicate fastest lap)

† Driver did not finish the race, but was classified as he completed over 90% of the race distance.

References

External links
 
 

1996 births
Living people
Italian racing drivers
European Touring Car Cup drivers
SEAT León Eurocup drivers
TCR International Series drivers
24H Series drivers
Engstler Motorsport drivers